The South Central Railway  (abbreviated SCR) is one of the 19 zones of Indian Railways. The jurisdiction of the zone is spread over the states of Telangana, Maharashtra, Karnataka,   Andhra Pradesh. It has three divisions under its administration, which include Secunderabad, Hyderabad and Nanded. It was re-organized in 2019 and the divisions of Vijayawada, Guntur and Guntakal railway divisions were separated to form South Coast Railway zone. Secunderabad railway station is the current headquarter and Arun Kumar Jain is the present general manager of the zone.

History 
Hon'ble Ex MP Bayya Suryanarayana Murthy requested in creation of New railway zone at While  speaking  about the  size  of the zones, he said the following: "I am tempted to speak about the  Southern  zone.   This  zone,  as  I said, consists of 6.017 miles.   It spreads itself like a leviathan into five States— Bombay,   Mysore,   Andhra   Pradesh, Madras  and  Kerala.   It  is   not   only over-sized    but  it  is  unwieldy.   The Railway  Board  has  to  consider  whether  it  could  not  be  bifurcated.   In this  connection,  the  creation  of  a  new zone  known  as  the    South  Central Zone may be  thought  of.   It may consist  of  the  following  divisions:  Bez- wada  division,  Guntakal.  Hubli,  Wal- tair,  Secunderabad and Sholapur  division.   I  think  the creation  of that new zone will  relieve the  General Manager of  the  existing  zone  of  some at  his duties  and  will  give  him  '  breathing space to concentrate his attention upon other  divisions I  do  not  think  there  will  be  any extra  expenditure  if  we  create  a  new zone".    Secunderabad,  which   will  be part  of  the  new  zone,  was  the  headquarters  of  the  Nizam’s  railways.   As such,  the  buildings  and  other  paraphernalia  necessary  for  the  headquarters  of  a  zone  are  already  there 

The zone was formed on 2 October 1966 by merging the carved out divisions of Hubli, Vijayawada of Southern Railway zone and Solapur, Secunderabad of Nizam's Guaranteed State Railway's. On 2 October 1977, Guntakal division of Southern Railway zone was merged and the already merged division of Solapur was demerged from the zone and became part of its former Central Railway zone. On 17 February 1978, Hyderabad division was formed by splitting the existing Secunderabad railway division. On 1 April 2003, two new divisions of Guntur and Nanded were created in this zone and the Hubli division was demerged and became part of South Western Railway zone.
Khandwa Akola section was merged into Bhusaval Division of Central Railways as the line was taken up for Gauge Conversion in 2017. On 27 February 2019, AP part of Waltair Division, Vijayawada, Guntur and Guntakal divisions were merged into newly formed South Coast Railway zone.

Jurisdiction 

The zone is spread over the states of Telangana, Maharashtra, Andhra Pradesh, Karnataka.

Divisions

 Secunderabad railway division
 Hyderabad railway division
 Nanded railway division

Infrastructure

Workshops 
The zone has mechanical workshops at Mettuguda and Lallaguda.

Sheds 
The zone has diesel loco sheds at Kazipet and Moula Ali . The zone has electric loco sheds at Lallaguda(Secunderabad) and Kazipet. The zone has one EMU Car shed at Moula Ali EMU.

Depots 
The zone has Passenger coach care depots at Hyderabad, Secunderabad, Kacheguda, Kazipet, Nanded and Purna. Additionally, Ramagundam, Bellampally have wagon maintenance depots.

Training Institutes 
The zone has training institutes for imparting and learning railway techniques serving both Indian as well foreign railway staffs at Secunderabad, Kazipet and Washim.

Healthcare 
Railway Hospitals located in these areas
Lallaguda (Secunderabad), Kazipet and Nanded have healthcare facilities serving exclusively for the employees of Indian railways and their families.

Loco sheds
 Electric Loco Shed, Lallaguda
 Electric Loco Shed, Kazipet
 Electric Loco Shed, Vijayawada
 Diesel Loco Shed, Gooty
 Diesel Loco Shed, Guntakal
 Diesel Loco Shed, Moula Ali
 Diesel Loco Shed, Kazipet

Routes
 Delhi-Chennai main line (diagonal of golden quadrilateral Grand trunk route) connecting north-south regions.
 Jn(excl)- Jn- (excl)
Jn-  Jn- Jn(excl) connecting delhi-chennai line to mumbai-chennai main line
Jn- -Jn- Jn

Projects 

 Electric loco shed, Guntakal
 Midlife Coach factory, Kurnool
 Periodic Wagon overhauling workshop, Kazipet
 Bogie Components Manufacturing unit, Thottambedu

The Manoharabad-Kothapally railway line, which connects Karimnagar to Manoharabad is currently under construction and is expected to be completed in 2025.
 Mahbubnagar-Munirabad new line, this line received funds in the 2023 Union Budget

Performance and earnings 

For the financial year 2018–19, the zone had transported  of freight and earned; while it transported  passengers and earned . It runs a total of 744 trains per day, with a passenger footfall of five hundred thousand.

Achievements 
South Central Railway topped among all railway zones of India in terms of train Punctuality and passenger earnings in 2016–17. The South Central Railway (SCR) has become the first railway zone in the country to complete 100 per cent LED lighting at all 733 stations under its jurisdiction. In 2018, it was ranked second in cleanliness of all railway zones in India.

See also 
 MMTS Hyderabad
 All India Station Masters' Association (AISMA)
 Nizam's Guaranteed State Railway

References

External links 
 

Zones of Indian Railways
Rail transport in Telangana
Railway companies established in 1966
1966 establishments in India